The Sumaúma State Park is a small state park within the city of Manaus in the state of Amazonas, Brazil. It is located in the heart of a densely populated neighbourhood, and is threatened by pollution and illegal extraction and hunting.

Location

The Sumaúma State Park is in the city of Manaus.
It is south of Avenida Noel Nutels and east of Avenida Governador José Lindoso in the north east of the city, one of the mostly densely populated parts of the Manaus urban area.
Two springs rise in the park and feed the Igarapé do Mindú, which runs through the city.
The park contains an educational walk, a community centre, recreation area and seedling nursery.
The park is decorated with statues representing animals and legendary people of the Amazon.

History

It was the result of efforts to protect one of the few remaining green spaces in the city by the Cidade Nova bairro, which contains the park, the Urban Forest Fragments volunteer group and the Legislative Assembly.
It became part of the Central Amazon Ecological Corridor, established in 2002.
The consultative council was created on 24 August 2007, and the management plan was approved on 2 March 2009.
50 volunteer environmental agents help with the park.
The park was pillaged in 2014, and reopened in February 2015 with surveillance cameras and 24 hour security.

Environment

The park is named after the Sumaúma tree (Ceiba pentandra).
It contains remnants of primary forest, low and high rainforest, grassland and Mauritia flexuosa palms.
There are over 80 species of birds, some endemic to the palms.
The park is home to various small mammals, including the threatened pied tamarin (Saguinus bicolor).
Other species include the brown-throated sloth (Bradypus variegatus), red-rumped agouti (Dasyprocta leporina) and green iguana (Iguana iguana).

The park is contaminated with garbage dumped from the surrounding houses and with discharges from sewers into the streams.
Other threats are illegal removal of wood and other forest products, hunting of small mammals and noise pollution, which may affect reproduction.
The areas under most threat are the flatter areas, and those around the edge of the park or along the trails.
The steeper slopes have suffered less.

Notes

Sources

2003 establishments in Brazil
State parks of Brazil
Protected areas of Amazonas (Brazilian state)
Protected areas established in 2003
Manaus